In tennis, a pusher is a defensive player who "pushes" back any shot they can chase down, without deliberately hitting a winner. They can angle shots, aim deep, as well as produce effective lobs. Pushers are extremely quick and consistent, rarely making errors. This style of play, similar to a "human backboard", often tires and frustrates more offensive opponents. They will try to win games by eliciting unforced errors from the opponent, i.e. by waiting for them to make the first mistake and losing the point. Pushers love to "dink" balls back with sidespin or backspin, placing their shots at disadvantageous locations for their opponents. The pusher's strategy also tends to involve a fair amount of psychological warfare.

Counter-strategies 
Playing pushers, especially in the lower levels of competition, can be difficult for players unaccustomed to their style. However, there are several counter-strategies players use to defeat pushers.

Playing the net 
Bringing pushers to the net is a good way to move them out of their comfort zones. Players use drop shots or chip and charge tactics to accomplish this. Volleying from the net can also be effective against pushers. Hitting the ball at the net cuts down on the time that the ball takes to  reach other side, making it harder for the pushers to run down the ball. Even if they do reach it, chances are that their return shot will be an easy put-away. Varying the placements of volleys, so they do not become predictable, is also a good tactic.

Mental approach 
Players should try to never let the pusher see them being frustrated. Pushers play with the mentality that, "It's a lot more frustrating to make a mistake than to have an opponent hit a brilliant shot that no one could have gotten." A pusher's mental game is key to his or her success, and an opponent who is obviously tired and angry will make the pusher more confident. Players should try to stay calm and focused to outlast and beat pushers.

Timed aggression 
Most pushers hit few winners and do not have good passing shots, so their opponents can wait for the perfect ball to attack. Being aggressive on the second serve is also effective as it could be the only short ball the pusher will hit during the whole rally. Because many of the pusher's balls float deep, have backspin, or very little pace, their opponents recognize the importance of moving to the ball quickly, as the pusher wants them to be lazy when approaching their shots. Getting to the ball early allows players to hit balls on the rise, generating more pace and making the ball harder to return.

Pushers' weaknesses 
Hitting a moonball to a pusher's backhand side will often force them to hit a lob, allowing a relatively leisurely overhead to end the point. In some cases, players may be able to outlast the pusher by hitting several cross-court strokes and waiting for the pusher to hit a ball that can be volleyed away. If a player does not put a lot of topspin on their shots, their opponent may well try to control the center court. This forces the pusher to go for deeper and more angled shots, which are harder to hit without topspin.

See also 

Tennis strategy

References 

Tennis terminology